Bristol, known from 1632 to 1765 as Pemaquid (today a village within the town) is a town in Lincoln County, Maine, United States. The population was 2,834 at the 2020 census. A fishing and resort area, Bristol includes the villages of New Harbor, Pemaquid, Round Pond, Bristol Mills and Chamberlain.  It includes the Pemaquid Archeological Site, a U.S. National Historic Landmark. During the 17th and early 18th century, New France defined the Kennebec River as the southern boundary of Acadia, which put Bristol within Acadia.

History

Once territory of the Wawenock (or Walinakiak, meaning "People of the Bay") Abenaki Indians, early Bristol was one of the most important and embattled frontier settlements in the province. Beginning with seasonal fishing, as early as 1625 the English established at Pemaquid Point a year-round trading post for fur trading. In 1631, the area was granted as the Pemaquid Patent by the Plymouth Council to Robert Aldsworth and Gyles Elbridge, merchants from Bristol, England.

Raid on Pemaquid (1632) 

A village and palisade fort were constructed.

In 1632, Pemaquid was raided and plundered by the pirate Dixie Bull.

The Great Colonial Hurricane on August 15, 1635 sank the galleon Angel Gabriel while anchored off the settlement, drowning some crew and passengers.

In 1664, the Duke of York (the future King James II) claimed Pemaquid was within his patent, which also included Sagadahoc and recently acquired New Amsterdam. To help anglicize the latter into New York City, Governor Sir Edmund Andros had some of its Dutch inhabitants transported to Pemaquid, now called Jamestown for its royal owner. By 1665, the village had approximately 30 houses.

King Philip's War

Raid on Pemaquid (1676)

During King Philip's War, in 1676 Indians attacked and burned English settlements up the coast, including Pemaquid. The following year, a new wooden defense called Fort Charles was built.

King William's War

Siege of Pemaquid (1689)

During King William's War—the first of four French and Indian Wars—Fort Charles and the village were attacked and destroyed in 1689 by the French from Castine, Maine. The inhabitants of Pemaquid were either killed or taken prisoner.

Siege of Pemaquid (1696)

By 1692, the English regained control of the region, and Sir William Phipps ordered construction of Fort William Henry, named after King William III of England. This time built of stone.

On August 14–15, 1696, the famous Pierre Le Moyne d'Iberville captured and destroyed the fort along with a combined force of French and Indians from present-day Castine. Commander of the fort, Captain Pascoe Chubb surrendered the fort. Iberville killed three of the soldiers and sent the other ninety-two back to Boston. In response to this raid Benjamin Church was sent from Boston to attack Acadia.

Raid on Pemaquid (1717)

In early May 1717, a sloop under the command of a Captain Carr was captured by ten pirates on a 25-ton sloop (formerly owned by a Colonel Stephen Minot) in Pemaquid.  The pirate sloop had come from Monhegan to the south, where on April 29, the Snow (a type of two masted vessel) Anne arrived.  The Anne had originally been captured off the Virginia Capes in April by the pirate Samuel Bellamy in the Whydah, which wrecked in a storm on the night of April 26, 1717 off of Cape Cod.  The Anne made it through the storm with another captured vessel, the Fisher (which was soon abandoned and the pirates aboard her transferred to the Anne).  The pirates arrived at Monhegan on April 29, and waited for the Whydah, for the pirates had not seen nor heard about the Whydah'''s wrecking in the storm of the night of April 26.  The pirates eventually realized the Whydah was lost, and proceeded to attack vessels in the area, including Matinicus Island (which is where the sloop the pirates used at Pemaquid was captured from).  The attack at Pemaquid was described in a deposition as follows:

...[the pirates] went after Capt. Carr's sloop, lying at Pemaquid, which they alsoe took a little distance from said Pemaquid, but finding the Mast and Bowspreat not serviceable [to repair the snow] they left her there, and brought the Master thereof aboard the Snow then at Menhagen [Monhegan]...

The pirates soon left the area, abandoning all the other vessels (including the Anne'') they had captured and most of their prisoners at Matinicus on or about May 9, 1717 on Minot's sloop.

Father Rale's War

During Father Rale's War, the location was a rendezvous for Natives and French to return inhabitants of Pemaquid and vicinity that they had taken prisoner during the war.

Colonel David Dunbar, Surveyor-General of the King's Woods, rebuilt the fort in 1729–1730, renaming it Fort Frederick. He renamed the town Harrington after the Earl of Harrington, who had helped arrange the 1729 Treaty of Seville.

King George's War

Raid on Pemaquid (1747)

During King George's War, Fort Frederick withstood two attacks in 1747, but in 1759 was decommissioned at the end of the French and Indian Wars.

American Revolution

In 1775, the town dismantled the fort to prevent it from becoming a British stronghold during the Revolutionary War. The state acquired the site in 1902, and in 1908 rebuilt the tower of Fort William Henry under guidance of historian John Henry Cartland, using many original stones. In 1993, the site was designated a National Historic Landmark.

Bristol established

On June 21, 1765, the town was incorporated as Bristol, named after the home port of the Pemaquid Patent proprietors.

During the War of 1812, the waters off Pemaquid Point saw the capture of HMS Boxer by the USS Enterprise on September 5, 1813. The town would set off land to create Nobleboro in 1788, Bremen in 1828, Damariscotta in 1848 and South Bristol in 1915. Today, Bristol is a popular tourist destination.

Geography

Bristol is situated on the Pemaquid Peninsula, which extends into the Gulf of Maine and the Atlantic Ocean.

Demographics

As of 2000 the median income for a household in the town was $38,400, and the median income for a family was $45,184. Males had a median income of $31,627 versus $19,800 for females. The per capita income for the town was $21,821.  About 3.3% of families and 6.0% of the population were below the poverty line, including 5.9% of those under age 18 and 6.8% of those age 65 or over.

2010 census

As of the census of 2010, there were 2,755 people, 1,309 households, and 828 families residing in the town. The racial makeup of the town was 98.4% White, 0.1% African American, 0.2% Native American, 0.4% Asian, and 0.9% from two or more races. Hispanic or Latino of any race were 0.5% of the population.

There were 1,309 households, of which 18.6% had children under the age of 18 living with them, 53.2% were married couples living together, 7.0% had a female householder with no husband present, 3.1% had a male householder with no wife present, and 36.7% were non-families. 30.9% of all households were made up of individuals, and 17% had someone living alone who was 65 years of age or older. The average household size was 2.09 and the average family size was 2.55.

The median age in the town was 54.1 years. 15.2% of residents were under the age of 18; 4.2% were between the ages of 18 and 24; 17.3% were from 25 to 44; 34.8% were from 45 to 64; and 28.5% were 65 years of age or older. The gender makeup of the town was 49.4% male and 50.6% female.

Sites of interest

 Fishermen's Museum
 Fort William Henry
 Granite Hall Store
 Harrington Meeting House
 Loudville Church on Louds Island
 Pemaquid Archeological Site
 Pemaquid Point Lighthouse

Notable people 

 Thomas Drummond, judge
 David Hanna, artist
 Marcus Hanna, noted lighthouse keeper
 Robert Livingston Ireland, Jr., businessman (summer resident)
 William North, senator from New York
 Samoset, Abenaki sagamore
 Joshua Soule, Methodist bishop
 Elizabeth Upham Yates, suffragist and missionary

References

Further reading

External links

 Town of Bristol, Maine
 Bristol Area Library 
	

 
Towns in Lincoln County, Maine
Populated coastal places in Maine
1765 establishments in the Thirteen Colonies